JoAllyn Archambault (born 1942) is a cultural anthropologist with an expertise in Native American people. She is the director of the Smithsonian Institution's American Indian Program. Born to a Sioux father and Creek mother, Archambault was raised in Sioux traditions and is a member of the Standing Rock Sioux Tribe of North and South Dakota. Archambault has made a great contribution to anthropology by providing an insider's perspective to her research on Native American people.

Education and teaching
She attended the University of California, Berkeley for her entire education, earning her Bachelor of Arts in 1970, her Master of Arts in 1974, and her anthropology Ph.D.  in 1984. The research for her doctorate focused on the Gallup ceremonial, an annual tourist event held in Gallup, New Mexico to display the Native American arts of that region.

Career
Archambault has devoted her life to teaching, researching, and administering programs relating to North American studies. She has taught classes in Native American studies at numerous colleges and universities including:  Pine Ridge Tribal College, Pine Ridge Reservation, South Dakota; University of California, Berkeley; the University of New Mexico; and Johns Hopkins University. Her research interests focus on several urban and reservation communities in specific areas including reservation land use, health evaluation, expressive art, material culture, contemporary native culture, and the sun dance ceremony of eight different Plains groups.

Archambault worked as a Professor at the University of Wisconsin in the Department of Anthropology (1983–86). She also worked as the Director of Ethnic studies at the California College of Arts and Crafts in Oakland, California (1978–83).

She currently works for the Smithsonian Institution as the Director of the American Indian program of the National Museum of Natural History in Washington, DC. Archambault began working there in 1986. Some of her responsibilities at the museum include preserving and promoting Native American art, culture, and political anthropology. She also acts as an ethnic liaison, supervises Native American fellowship interns, and manages a $110,000 annual program budget.

Professional memberships
 American Ethnological Society
 Commission on Native American Reburial of the American Anthropological Association
 University of California Joint Academic Senate-Administration Committee on Human Skeletal Remains
 American Association of Anthropology
 National Anthropologists Association

Exhibits
Archambault was responsible for the redesign of the North American Indian Ethnology Halls for the “Changing Culture in a Changing World” exhibit. She has also curated four major exhibits: “Plains Indian Arts: Change and Continuity” (1987), “100 Years of Plains Indian Painting” (1989), “Indian Basketry and Their Makers” (1990), and “Seminole!” (1990). She also contributed to the Los Angeles Southwest Museum's quincentennial exhibit “Grand-father, Heart our voices” in 1992.

Works
 Traditional Arts (1980)
 Dur Samedi pour Lili (2000)
 Waiting for Winston Elkhart (2013)

References

1942 births
Living people
Cultural anthropologists
UC Berkeley College of Letters and Science alumni
University of California, Berkeley College of Letters and Science faculty
Johns Hopkins University faculty
20th-century American non-fiction writers
21st-century American non-fiction writers
20th-century American women writers
21st-century American women writers
American women anthropologists
Smithsonian Institution people
American women academics
20th-century Native American women
20th-century Native Americans
21st-century Native American women
21st-century Native Americans
Standing Rock Sioux people